Olympia, sometimes referred to as Olympiastadion, is a football stadium in Helsingborg, Sweden. It was opened in 1898, but has been rebuilt in 1993, 1997 and 2014–2017, and has a capacity of 17,200 (9,673 seated and about 7,500 ground attendance stands). All stands can be converted into seaters, giving a capacity of around 13,000). It is the home ground of Allsvenskan side Helsingborgs IF.

On October 22, 2014 the Helsingborg City Council, who owns Olympia, unanimously voted to renovate and rebuild the stadium. The construction will start after the 2014 Allsvenskan season and will be finished in early to mid 2017. 
This will be the fourth updating of the arena since 1985. Before 1985 the arena was in a dreadful state with
athletic running tracks, wooden stands, and a very poor lighting system.

The name of this arena has no actual connection to the Olympic Games, but since the modern Olympic's started in 1896 and Olympia was opened two years later, it seems a possible thought that the name was influenced by the at the time renewed Olympic Games.

The record for attendance is 26,154 and was set 14 May 1954, when Helsingborgs IF played Malmö FF.

In 1958 the stadium hosted two FIFA World Cup matches, and seven matches in FIFA Women's World Cup 1995.

At the Helsingborgs IF matches Hey Jude by The Beatles is played during halftime and when Helsingborgs IF win a game What a Beautiful Day by The Levellers is played.

References

External links 
 Helsingborgs IF

Football venues in Sweden
1958 FIFA World Cup stadiums
1995 FIFA Women's World Cup stadiums
Sport in Helsingborg
Buildings and structures in Helsingborg
Tourist attractions in Skåne County
Sports venues completed in 1898
1898 establishments in Sweden
19th-century establishments in Skåne County